Current and historical bilateral relations exist between Australia and North Korea.

The two countries nominally have different relations, though as of 2013 neither Australia or North Korea has an official diplomatic presence in the other country. Instead, diplomatic relations between the two are handled by non-resident embassies. The Australian embassy in Seoul manages relations with North Korea, while the DPRK embassy in Jakarta, Indonesia, is responsible for relations with Australia. Additionally, the Swedish embassy in Pyongyang provides limited assistance to Australians.

Generally the relations are stressed, due to Australia being a close ally of the United States in the Korean War and modern disputes such as over the North Korean nuclear program.

According to a 2013 BBC World Service Poll, only 7% of Australians view North Korea's influence positively, with 85% expressing a negative view.

History

In 2003, in an event called The Pong Su incident, the North Korean ship Pong Su was discovered in Australian waters while its crew members were smuggling heroin. The ship attempted an escape and was taken over by the Australian commandos after four days chase.

In January 2008, North Korea closed its embassy in Canberra. In January 2013, North Korea requested permission to reopen its Canberra embassy, despite Australia supporting increased international sanctions against the country due to its continued nuclear regime. Australia rejected the request in June 2013.

The Australian Ambassador to South Korea William Paterson took an official four-day trip in June 2016 to North Korea, which included meetings with government officials in Pyongyang as well as travelling outside the capital to inspect Australian aid-funded projects.

The Australian Defence Force has periodically deployed warships and aircraft to North Asia since 2018 as part of the international efforts to enforce the sanctions against North Korea. This deployment is designated Operation Argos.

Former Australian embassy
The Australian Embassy in Pyongyang opened on 30 April 1975 by John Watson, Resident Charge. Watson had a staff of about six, with some local employees. Stephen FitzGerald, who was resident Ambassador to China, was accredited Ambassador to North Korea. He presented his credentials to North Korea's vice president on 30 May 1975.

The embassy was closed on 8 November 1975 following inter-governmental problems and Australian staff were withdrawn. Australia did not withdraw the accreditation of its non-resident Ambassador to North Korea, but did not renew the accreditation when it changed ambassadors to China. Talks on re-establishing diplomatic ties between the two countries were had in 1979, and again in 1990, but relations were not resumed until May 2000, and the Embassy in Seoul has been accredited to North Korea since August 2008.

References 

 
Bilateral relations of North Korea
Korea, North
Asian-Australian culture